Farouk Al-Kasim (8 July 1934) is a Norwegian-Iraqi petroleum geologist. He played a major role in the exploitation of Norway's petroleum resources within the Norwegian Petroleum Directorate.

Al-Kasim was decorated Knight 1st Class of the Order of St. Olav in 24 September 2012.

Biography

Life in Iraq 
A native of Basra in Iraq, Al-Kasim studied petroleum geology at the Imperial College London in London thanks to a partnership with the Iraq Petroleum Company. There he met his wife, Solfrid, and returned to Iraq in 1957. Later he started working for the Iraq Petroleum Company.

In 1968, Al-Kasim and his family left Iraq because of their son's medical problems. Because only Norway offered the care his son needed, they moved to Oslo, Norway.

Life in Norway 
In 1968, Norway's Ministry of Industry hired Al-Kasim as a consultant. His job was to analyse the North Sea exploration results. He and his colleagues proposed a white paper giving an important part to state participation. This work led to a law, voted unanimously, and the creation of a Norwegian Petroleum Directorate and a national company, Statoil. 'The Labour government "wanted this to be the new impetus in Norwegian industry.", he says. "And for that to be done properly, according to a socialist, the state has to be in the driving seat". Al Kasim agreed with that view, and so landed the job of writing the nation's blueprint for how it would organise its fledgling oil industry.'

He became the director of resource management of the Norwegian Petroleum Directorate and has been given credit for high level of extraction rate of oil from the different fields—45% compared to 25% worldwide, spurring the rate of technological development.

References

1934 births
Living people
History of the petroleum industry in Norway
Iraqi emigrants to Norway
Scientists from Oslo
People from Basra
Norwegian petroleum geologists
20th-century Norwegian geologists